was an old province of Japan on the east coast of Kyūshū, corresponding to the modern Miyazaki Prefecture. Hyūga bordered on Bungo, Higo, Ōsumi, and Satsuma  Province.

The ancient capital was near Saito.

History
In the Kojiki and the Nihon Shoki, Hyūga is called  of Tsukushi-no-shima (Kyushu), along the provinces of Tsukushi, Toyo and Hi.

In the 3rd month of the 6th year of the Wadō era (713), the land of Hyūga was administratively separated from Ōsumi Province (大隅国).  In that same year, Empress Genmei's Daijō-kan continued to organize other cadastral changes in the provincial map of the Nara period.

During the Sengoku period, the area was often divided into a northern fief around Agata castle (near modern Nobeoka), and a southern fief around Obi castle, near modern Nichinan. The southern fief was held by the Shimazu clan of nearby Satsuma for much of the period. The Itō clan held control of Hyuga until it was conquered by the Shimazu in 1578.

Historical districts
 Miyazaki Prefecture
 Koyu District (児湯郡)
 Miyazaki District (宮崎郡) - absorbed Kitanaka District on April 1, 1896; now dissolved
 Naka District (那珂郡)
 Kitanaka District (北那珂郡) - merged into Miyazaki District on April 1, 1896
 Minaminaka District (南那珂郡) - dissolved
 Usuki District (臼杵郡)
 Higashiusuki District (東臼杵郡)
 Nishiusuki District (西臼杵郡)
 Mixed
 Morokata District (諸県郡)
 Higashimorokata District (東諸県郡) - became part of Miyazaki Prefecture on May 9, 1883
 Kitamorokata District (北諸県郡) - became part of Miyazaki Prefecture on May 9, 1883
 Minamimorokata District (南諸県郡) - became part of Kagoshima Prefecture on May 9, 1883; later merged with Higashisoo District (東囎唹郡) (also from Kagoshima Prefecture) to become the 2nd incarnation of Soo District (囎唹郡) on March 29, 1896
 Nishimorokata District (西諸県郡) - became part of Miyazaki Prefecture on May 9, 1883

See also
 Takanabe Domain
 IJN Hyūga, 1918-1945
 JDS Hyūga, 2009–present

Notes

References
 Nussbaum, Louis-Frédéric and Käthe Roth. (2005).  Japan encyclopedia. Cambridge: Harvard University Press. ;  OCLC 58053128
 Titsingh, Isaac. (1834).  Annales des empereurs du Japon (Nihon Ōdai Ichiran).  Paris: Royal Asiatic Society, Oriental Translation Fund of Great Britain and Ireland. OCLC 5850691.

Other websites 

  Murdoch's map of provinces, 1903

Former provinces of Japan